Special municipality is a name for some types of administrative division.

Occurrences
 Special municipality (Netherlands), a type of administrative division in the Netherlands
 Special municipality (Taiwan), a type of administrative division in Taiwan

Types of administrative division